Pieter Arnout Dijxhoorn (1810–1839), a Dutch marine painter, was born at Rotterdam in 1810. He was a scholar of Martinus Schouman and of J. C. Schotel, and painted marine subjects and river scenes in an able manner. He died at Rotterdam in 1839.

References
 

1810 births
1839 deaths
Dutch marine artists
Painters from Rotterdam
19th-century Dutch painters
Dutch male painters
19th-century Dutch male artists